Right & Wrong: How to Decide for Yourself is a book on ethics by Hugh Mackay published in 2004 and again with an updated edition in 2005.

References

External links
 Google Books link

Australian non-fiction books
Ethics books